El Siete Machos (aka The Seven Macho Men) is a 1951 Mexican comedy western film directed by Miguel M. Delgado, and starring Cantinflas, Alma Rosa Aguirre, and Miguel Ángel Ferriz.

Plot
After the tragic death of her father, who had been ambushed and killed years ago, Rosario returns to the ranch that had belonged to him. Rosario arrives with the desire to meet "El Siete Machos" ("The Seven Macho Men"), an outlaw who in the style of Robin Hood distributes the loot of his robberies among the poor, called like that because "he possesses the courage of seven macho men". Along the way, Rosario meets Margarito, a naive but rogueish ranch hand who looks identical to El Siete Machos.

Cast
 Cantinflas as Margarito / El Siete Machos 
 Alma Rosa Aguirre as Rosario  
 Miguel Ángel Ferriz as Don Carmelo 
 Miguel Inclán as Toño 
 Delia Magaña as Chole
 Carlos Martínez Baena as Padre Guzmán (as Carlos M. Baena)  
 Rafael Icardo as Don Ceferino
 José Elías Moreno as El Chacal 
 Antonio R. Frausto as Jefe municipal 
 Enriqueta Reza as Yerbera 
 Ernesto Finance as Miembro de la banda del Siete Machos 
 Carlos Múzquiz as  Manuel 
 Ángel Infante as Don Guadalupe
 Víctor Alcocer (uncredited)
 José Chávez (uncredited)
 Edmundo Espino como Maestro (uncredited)
 José Luis Fernández as Miembro de la banda (uncredited)
 Jesús García as Peón (uncredited)
 Leonor Gómez as Cocinera (uncredited)
 Cecilia Leger as Invitada a fiesta (uncredited)
 Kika Meyer as Mujer en cantina (uncredited)
 José Muñoz as Florentino (uncredited)
 José Pardavé as Peón (uncredited)
 Aurora Ruiz as Felisa (uncredited)

References

External links
 

1951 films
1950s Spanish-language films
1950s Western (genre) comedy films
Films directed by Miguel M. Delgado
Mexican black-and-white films
Mexican Western (genre) comedy films
1951 comedy films
1950s Mexican films